Anne Wright (born 1924) was a lecturer in modern history and warden at the University of St Andrews. Wright was the only female lecturer in the School of Modern History at that time: Doris Ketelbey had retired in 1958, and Margaret Lambert had left in 1960.

Early life 
Wright was born and educated in St Andrews. Her father was John N. Wright, a University of St Andrews staff member. Wright graduated in 1946 from the University of St Andrews with an MA Honours in History. 

Four years after her graduation, she worked with a Church of Scotland organisation that had provided 'Huts and Canteens’' during the war; she ran a hostel in post-war Berlin for members of the forces and their wives. After returning from Berlin, Wright spent almost twenty years as a secondary school teacher. She trained in Dundee and taught around London in 1950, before returning to St Andrews in 1961, likely due to her mother’s poor health. Wright taught around Fife, Tayside, and in St Andrews at St Leonard’s School and at Grove Academy until in 1966, when she became warden of Hamilton Hall in St Andrews.

Career 
The role of warden combined administrative duties with teaching roles. Wright was appointed as a lecturer in the department of Modern History due to her degree and teaching experience in History. Wright was warden of Hamilton Hall and taught in the department of Modern History until her death in 1981.

Later life and legacy 
Wright died of cancer at age 56. Wright’s colleagues and former students set up the Anne Wright scholarship for postgraduate research in Arts, and an Anne Wright Memorial Fund for the students of the University.

References 

1926 births
1981 deaths
Alumni of the University of St Andrews
Academics of the University of St Andrews